The 1957–58 season was Fussball Club Basel 1893's 64th season in their existence. It was their twelfth consecutive season in the top flight of Swiss football after their promotion from the Nationalliga B the season 1945–46. They played their home games in the Landhof, in the Wettstein Quarter in Kleinbasel. Jules Düblin was the club's chairman for his twelfth successive period.

Overview 
The Austrian ex-international footballer Rudi Strittich was hired as new team manager this season. He took over from Béla Sárosi who had moved on to Jahn Regensburg. Basel played a total of 42 games this season. Of these 42 matches 26 were in the domestic league, two were in the Swiss Cup and 14 were friendly matches. The friendly games resulted with seven victories and seven defeats. In total, including the test games and the cup competition, 17 games were won, six games were drawn and 19 games were lost. In their 42 games the team scored 107 goals and conceded 87.

Fourteen teams contested the 1957–58 Nationalliga A, these were the top 12 teams from the previous season and the two newly promoted teams FC Biel-Bienne and FC Grenchen. The last two teams in the table at the end of the season were to be relegated. Basel won nine of their 26 games and drew six times and lost eleven times. They scored 59 goals and conceded 53. Basel ended the championship with 24 points in 9th position. They were 19 points behind Young Boys who were able to defend their championship title. At the end of the league table Urania Genève Sport and FC Winterthur ended the season joint second last, each with 18 points, and therefore they had to play a relegation play-off. Urania won the play-off and therefore Winterthur suffered relegation together with FC Biel-Bienne who had finished in last position.

Josef Hügi was the Basel's top league goal scorer with 18 goals. He managed two hat-tricks during the league season, in the first game of the season on 25 August 1957 at home against Winterthur and in the last game of the season on 1 June 1958 at home against Biel-Bienne. Gottlieb Stäuble was the team's second best goal scorer with nine goals, Rudolf Burger netted eight times and both Hermann Suter and Hans Weber netted seven times.

Basel joined the Swiss Cup in the third principal round. They were drawn at home at the Landhof against lower tier local team FC Oten on 2 November 1957. Hans Weber scored five goals during the second half of the game as Basel won 8–0. In the fourth round Basel were also drawn at home against lower tier FC Bern but here Basel were knocked out. Young Boys won the competition and thus completed the double.

Players 
The following is the list of the Basel first team squad during the season 1957–58. The list includes players that were in the squad on the day that the Nationalliga A season started on 25 August 1957 but subsequently left the club after that date.

 

 
 

 

 

Players who left the squad

Results 
Legend

Friendly matches

Pre- and mid-season

Winter break

Nationalliga A

League matches

League table

Swiss Cup

See also 
 History of FC Basel
 List of FC Basel players
 List of FC Basel seasons

References

Sources 
 Die ersten 125 Jahre. Publisher: Josef Zindel im Friedrich Reinhardt Verlag, Basel. 
 The FCB team 1957–58 at fcb-archiv.ch
 Switzerland 1957–58 by Erik Garin at Rec.Sport.Soccer Statistics Foundation

External links 
 FC Basel official site

FC Basel seasons
Basel